Herman A. Besse (August 16, 1911 – August 13, 1972) was an American Major League Baseball pitcher. He played for the Philadelphia Athletics during five seasons.

References

Major League Baseball pitchers
Philadelphia Athletics players
Baseball players from St. Louis
1911 births
1972 deaths
Jackson Senators players
Memphis Chickasaws players
Cedar Rapids Raiders players
Greenville Bucks players
Atlanta Crackers players
Toronto Maple Leafs (International League) players
Seattle Rainiers players
Los Angeles Angels (minor league) players
Springfield Cubs players
Sacramento Solons players
Tri-City Braves players
Burials at Calvary Cemetery (St. Louis)